Siddham is a Unicode block containing characters for the historical, Brahmi-derived Siddham script used for writing Sanskrit between the years c. 550 – c. 1200.

Block

History
The following Unicode-related documents record the purpose and process of defining specific characters in the Siddham block:

References 

Unicode blocks